Kjell Jerselius (born 27 September 1945) is an ex teacher at the Swedish school of NTI in Stockholm, but he is also a director of the movie Mot härliga tider (Happy Days Are Here Again).

External links

Swedish film directors
Living people
1945 births